Sibalom Natural Park is a  protected area in the Philippines on the island of Panay in the municipality of Sibalom, Antique. It was proclaimed a natural park on 23 April 2000. It is considered one of the last remaining lowland rainforests on Panay.

The park was first established on 28 June 1990 as the Tipulu-an Mau-it Rivers Watershed Forest Reserve covering  of an important watershed.

Geography
Sibalom Natural Park extends over sixteen barangays (village) in Sibalom. The park is organized around the watershed area of the Tipulu-an River and Mao-it River which are tributaries of the Sibalom River.

Forest 
The park has a mild montane forest, a lowland forest, some bushland and open cogon or grassland. Its riverbeds contain semi-precious gemstones such as agate, jasper and onyx.

About 5,000 hectares of forest in Sibalom from Mount Porras extending to Mount Igmatindog, covers Sibalom River and its tributaries. Of this forest, 672 hectares are undisturbed by any human activity while about 4,223 hectares constitutes the 50-year-old reforestation site.

Wildlife
The park serves as a corridor between two important bird areas on the island, the Northwest Panay Peninsula Natural Park and the Central Panay Mountain Range. It supports 76 bird species, 28 of which are endemic to the Philippines including the Negros bleeding-heart, Walden's hornbill, Visayan hornbill, brahminy kite, blue-naped parrot, white-winged cuckooshrike and eastern grass owl. Other endemic fauna known to inhabit the park include the Visayan spotted deer, Visayan warty pig, and some herpetofaunal species such as the giant Visayan frog, Negros truncated-toed chorus frog, collared monitor lizard and Philippine sailfin lizard.

Flora
One of the main highlights is the large flower Rafflesia speciosa, discovered in Mount Porras and surrounding barangays in 2002

The Philippine dipterocarp trees such as white lauan and apitong, and fruit trees such as antipolo and malapaho are found in the forests of Sibalom.  The globally endangered giant flower, the Rafflesia speciosa, also blooms in the park.

See also
 List of national parks of the Philippines
 List of protected areas of the Philippines
 List of World Heritage Sites in the Philippines

References

Natural parks of the Philippines
Birdwatching sites in the Philippines
Geography of Antique (province)
Protected areas established in 1990
1990 establishments in the Philippines
Tourist attractions in Antique (province)